Arnaud Grand (born 28 August 1990 in Montreux) is a Swiss former cyclo-cross and road cyclist.

Major results

Cyclo-cross

2006–2007
 2nd Junior race, National Championships
2009–2010
 1st  Under-23 race, National Championships
 4th Under-23 race, UEC European Championships
 4th Under-23 race, UCI World Championships
2010–2011
 1st  Under-23 race, National Championships
2011–2012
 4th Overall UCI Under-23 World Cup
 8th Under-23 race, UCI World Championships
2014–2015
 1st Flückiger Cross Madiswil

Road
2013
 1st Stage 2 Tour of the Gila
2014
 4th Tour de Berne

References

External links

1990 births
Living people
Swiss male cyclists
People from Montreux
Cyclo-cross cyclists
Sportspeople from the canton of Vaud
20th-century Swiss people
21st-century Swiss people